The 1979 Summer Universiade, also known as the X Summer Universiade, took place in Mexico City, Mexico.

Sports

Medal table

 
1979
U
U
U
Multi-sport events in Mexico
Sports competitions in Mexico City
1970s in Mexico City
Summer Universiade
Summer Universiade